The 1879 Men's tennis tour  was composed of the fourth annual pre-open era tour and incorporated 26 tournaments. The 1879 Wimbledon Championships was won by John Hartley defending champion Patrick Francis Hadow, defending champion could not participate in the Challenge Round. This year saw the inaugural  Irish Championships that in its early stages of development was considered as important that of the Wimbledon Championships the event was won by Vere St. Leger Goold who defeated in Charles David Barry in the final by Charles David Barry 8–6, 8–6. Important this year was the staging of six hard court tournaments some of which included the Dublin University Championships the East Gloucestershire Championships held in Cheltenham Great Britain, Nice Tennis Tournament in Nice, France and the first tournament to be held outside of Europe in Australia with the Victorian Championships.

The tour started in Nice, France in May and ended in Melbourne, Australia in December.

Calendar 
Notes 1: Challenge Round: the final round of a tournament, in which the winner of a single-elimination phase faces the previous year's champion, who plays only that one match. The challenge round was used in the early history of tennis (from 1877 through 1921), in some tournaments not all.* Indicates challenger
Notes 2:Tournaments in italics were events that were staged only once that season

Key

January to April
No events

February

May

June

July

August

September

October

November 
No events

December

Event staged date unknown

List of tournament winners 
Note: Important tournaments in bold
  Vere St. Leger Goold—Irish Championships, Dublin (Earlsfort), Waterford—(3)
  Henry James Daley—Dublin—(1)
  A. F. Robinson—Melbourne—(1)
  Algernon Ambrose Michael Aylmer—Naas (1st)—(1) 
  Captain Short—Belfast—(1)
  Dale Womersley—Knighton—(1) 
  Edgar Lubbock—Hendon—(1)
  Edmond Bennet Brackenbury—Bournemouth(Oct)—(1)
   F.L. Cope—Armagh—(1) 
  George Edward Devere Kennedy—Naas (2nd)—(1) 
  Gwyn Saunders Davies—Newcastle Emlyn—(1) 
  Henry W. J. Gardner—Stafford—(1)
  Henry Lyle Mulholland—Nice—(1)
  John Hartley—Wimbledon Championships—(1)
  Joseph F. J. H. Considine—Limerick—(1)
  Leslie Balfour-Melville—St Andrews—(1)
  Montague Hankey—Dorchester—(1)
  Percy Lucas—Great Yarmouth—(1) 
  William Renshaw—Cheltenham—(1)
  Sir Hubert James Medlycott—Bournemouth (May)—(1)
  W.G. Eyre—Lisbeg—(1)

Rankings 
Source: The Concise History of Tennis

See also 
 1879 tennis season
 1879 in sports

References

Sources 
 A Social History of Tennis in Britain: Lake, Robert J. (2014), Volume 5 of Routledge Research in Sports History. Routledge, UK, .
 Ayre's Lawn Tennis Almanack And Tournament Guide, 1908 to 1938, A. Wallis Myers.
 British Lawn Tennis and Squash Magazine, 1948 to 1967, British Lawn Tennis Ltd, UK.
 Dunlop Lawn Tennis Almanack And Tournament Guide, G.P. Hughes, 1939 to 1958, Dunlop Sports Co. Ltd, UK
  Fein, Paul (2003). Tennis confidential : today's greatest players, matches, and controversies. Washington, D.C.: Potomac Books. ISBN 978-1574885262.
 Lawn tennis and Badminton Magazine, 1906 to 1973, UK.
 Lowe's Lawn Tennis Annuals and Compendia, Lowe, Sir F. Gordon, Eyre & Spottiswoode
 Spalding's Lawn Tennis Annuals from 1885 to 1922, American Sports Pub. Co, USA.
 Sports Around the World: History, Culture, and Practice, Nauright John and Parrish Charles, (2012), ABC-CLIO, Santa Barbara, Cal, US, .
 The Concise History of Tennis, Mazak Karoly, (2010), 6th Edition, 2015.
 Tennis; A Cultural History, Gillmeister Heiner, (1997), Leicester University Press, Leicester, UK.
 The Tennis Book, edited by Michael Bartlett and Bob Gillen, Arbor House, New York, 1981 
 The World of Tennis Annuals, Barrett John, 1970 to 2001.
 Total Tennis:The Ultimate Tennis Encyclopedia, by Bud Collins, Sport Classic Books, Toronto, Canada, 
 Wright & Ditson Officially Adopted Lawn Tennis Guide's 1890 to 1920 Wright & Ditsons Publishers, Boston, Mass, USA.
 http://www.tennisarchives.com/
 https://thetennisbase.com/

External links 
 http://www.tennisarchives.com/
 https://thetennisbase.com/1879 Season

Pre Open era tennis seasons
1879 Men's Tennis season